Sagliano may refer to:

 Sagliano Micca, a comune in the Province of Biella in the Italian region Piedmont
 Sagliano Crenna, a settlement in Varzi, Italy
 Francesco Sagliano, an Italian painter